Class 18 may refer to:

British Rail Class 18
The DRG Class 18 were German steam locomotives operated by the Deutsche Reichsbahn between the wars. These express tender locomotives had been taken over from the state railways and had a 4-6-2 (Pacific) wheel arrangement.

 Class 18.0: Saxon XVIII H
 Class 18.1: Württemberg C
 Class 18.2: Baden IV f
 Class 18.3: Baden IV h
 Class 18.4-5: Bavarian S 3/6
 Class 18.6: PKP Class Pm36
 Class T 18.10: turbine locomotives

see also: DR 18 201

Steam locomotives of Germany
2′C1′ locomotives